Australia's Indigenous Peoples Party was an Australian political party. It was registered on 13 January 1993 prior to contesting the 1993 federal election, when its results were mediocre. The party was deregistered in 1999. The party was associated with the Australian indigenous community.

References

Defunct political parties in Australia
Political parties established in 1993
Political parties disestablished in 1999
1993 establishments in Australia
1999 disestablishments in Australia
Indigenous Australian politics
Indigenist political parties in Oceania